Durvillaea amatheiae is a large, robust species of southern bull kelp found in Australia.

Description
The species can be confused with Durvillaea potatorum, which has an overlapping geographic distribution. D. potatorum has a shorter, wider stipe with more limited lateral blade development, whereas D. amatheiae has a shorter, narrow stipe and typically prolific lateral blade development.

Distribution
Durvillaea amatheiae is endemic to southeast Australia.

References

External links
 Algaebase: Durvillaea amatheiae X.A.Weber, G.J.Edgar, S.C.Banks, J.M.Waters & C.I.Fraser

Fucales
Flora of Australia
Edible seaweeds
Protists described in 2017